The Miracle Worker is a 1936 Soviet comedy film directed by Aleksandr Medvedkin.

Plot 

Collective farmers of the agricultural artel "White Sands" offer the witch Ulyana to take part in the divination over the cows. With the help of her, they hope to win the passing banner.

Starring 
 Leonid Alekseev		
 Tatyana Barysheva	
 Zinaida Bokareva
 Sergey Bulaevskiy
 Yelena Ibragimova-Dobrzhanskaya
 Lev Ivanov
 Zinovy Sazhin
 M. Shlenskaya
 Ivan Shtraukh
 V. Shtraus
 V. Tolstova

References

External links 

1936 films
1930s Russian-language films
Soviet comedy films
Soviet black-and-white films
1936 comedy films